Jürgen Neukirch (24 July 1937 – 5 February 1997) was a German mathematician known for his work on algebraic number theory.

Education and career
Neukirch received his diploma in mathematics in 1964 from the University of Bonn. For his Ph.D. thesis, written under the direction of Wolfgang Krull, he was awarded in 1965 the Felix-Hausdorff-Gedächtnis-Preis. He completed his habilitation one year later. From 1967 to 1969 he was guest professor at Queen's University in Kingston, Ontario and at the Massachusetts Institute of Technology in Cambridge, Massachusetts, after which he was a professor in Bonn. In 1971 he became a professor at the University of Regensburg.

Contributions
He is known for his work on the embedding problem in algebraic number theory, the Báyer–Neukirch theorem on special values of L-functions, arithmetic Riemann existence theorems and the Neukirch–Uchida theorem in birational anabelian geometry. He gave a simple description of the reciprocity maps in local and global class field theory.

Books
Neukirch wrote three books on class field theory, algebraic number theory, and the cohomology of number fields:

Notes

External links

 On Neukirch's death (in German)
 

1937 births
1997 deaths
20th-century German mathematicians
Number theorists
University of Bonn alumni
Academic staff of the University of Bonn
Academic staff of the University of Regensburg